Bird Hill is a summit in Scott County in the U.S. state of Missouri with an elevation of . 

Bird Hill has the name of Stephen Bird, an early settler.

References

Mountains of Scott County, Missouri
Mountains of Missouri